The Emirates College of Technology (ECT) is an institution of higher learning located in Abu Dhabi, United Arab Emirates.

Accreditation and certifications
ECT is licensed by the Ministry of Higher Education and Scientific Research (MOHESR) of the United Arab Emirates to award degrees in higher education. The college was first licensed in 2003. Each of ECT's bachelor's degree and Diploma programs is accredited by the Commission for Academic Accreditation, a unit of MOHESR.

Enrollment
In Fall 2014, ECT enrolled about 2,840 students. 56% of the students are male and about 70% are Emirati nationals. A total of 35 nationalities are represented in the student body. The majority of students attend evening or weekend classes. ECT has 108 full-time and 12 part-time faculty, and 106 staff.

References

1993 establishments in the United Arab Emirates
Educational institutions established in 1993
Universities and colleges in the Emirate of Abu Dhabi
Education in Abu Dhabi
Technical universities and colleges in the United Arab Emirates